Rosetown–Biggar was a constituency of the Legislative Assembly of Saskatchewan. It only existed during the 23rd Saskatchewan Legislature.

Representation 

 Berny Wiens (1995 to 1999) Saskatchewan New Democratic Party

References 

Former provincial electoral districts of Saskatchewan